This is a List of World Floorball Champions, including runners-up. A World Floorball Championship is awarded to the team which wins in the finals of that year's World Floorball Championships.

The Men's World Floorball Championships take place every December (since 2008) in every even year.
The Women's World Floorball Championships take place every December (since 2009) in every odd year.
The Men's under-19 World Floorball Championships take place every May (since 2009) in every odd year.
The Women's under-19 World Floorball Championships take place every May (since 2008) in every even year.

A World Floorball Championship is awarded biennially.

Men's World Floorball Championships

Women's World Floorball Championships

Men's under-19 World Floorball Championships

Women's under-19 World Floorball Championships

Floorball World Championships